Muamer Brajanac (born 15 February 2001) is a Danish professional footballer who plays as a forward for Danish 1st Division club Hobro IK. Born in Denmark, he is of Bosnian descent.

Club career
He made his Danish Superliga debut for AC Horsens on 25 October 2020 in a game against FC Nordsjælland. On 31 August 2021, he was loaned out to Norwegian club Aalesunds FK for the rest of 2021.

On 28 January 2022, Brajanac joined Danish 1st Division club Hobro IK on a deal until June 2024.

References

External links
 

2001 births
Living people
Danish men's footballers
Danish expatriate men's footballers
People from Kolding
Danish people of Bosnia and Herzegovina descent
Denmark youth international footballers
Association football forwards
Kolding IF players
Brøndby IF players
F.C. Copenhagen players
AC Horsens players
Aalesunds FK players
Hobro IK players
Danish Superliga players
Danish 1st Division players
Danish expatriate sportspeople in Norway
Expatriate footballers in Norway
Sportspeople from the Region of Southern Denmark